KLVB (99.5 FM) is a radio station serving the Sacramento metropolitan area with the Contemporary Christian format K-Love. It is owned and operated by the Educational Media Foundation Broadcasting, based in nearby Rocklin, California.

EMF re-launched KLVS in mid-April 2008 to serve the Sacramento area after moving the station in from Grass Valley, but on May 28, it went silent after the Federal Aviation Administration voiced concern over the new 358-foot radio tower the station built in El Dorado Hills. Although the tower had all the necessary approvals from the FCC, the FAA said those approvals should not have been given without its input. EMF has worked out the technical issues and returned now KLVB to the air in July 2012.

HD Radio
KLVB broadcasts 2 HD subchannels on 99.5 HD 2 and 99.5 HD 3 airing the Air 1 and K-Love 90s formats respectively.

References

External links

Radio stations established in 1999
K-Love radio stations
1999 establishments in California
Educational Media Foundation radio stations
LVB